Symphony No. 43 in E major, Hoboken I/43, is a symphony by Joseph Haydn. Since the nineteenth century it has been referred to by the subtitle "Mercury". The source of the "Mercury" nickname remains unknown according to Matthew Rye. It could refer to its use as incidental music from some play or other given at Eszterháza, or it may not have appeared until the nineteenth century. It would certainly be wrong to impose any programmatic elements on to the abstract musical drama and search for a portrait of the gods’ winged messenger. 

The symphony was composed by 1771. It is scored for two oboes, bassoon, two horns and strings. 
The work is in four movements:

Allegro, 
Adagio in A major, 
Menuetto & Trio, 
Allegro, 

H. C. Robbins Landon describes the work as "the Austrian chamber symphony par excellence". The first movement's first theme is "one of the longest of its kind that Haydn ever wrote". The movement lacks a true second subject. 

The slow movement is scored for muted violins with sparing use of woodwind. Robbins Landon describes the movement as having "a strong sense of nostalgia". It is the only movement of any of Haydn's symphonies to be in the key of A major. The menuetto is "marvellously kinetic and very Austrian".

The final movement has a long coda in which "finally everything dies away except for the first violin, which goes up to an enigmatic g-flat. There follows one of Haydn's magnificent silences, and then the music plunges into a last tutti and this elegant chamber symphony is at an end".

See also
List of symphonies by name

References

Symphony 043
Compositions in E-flat major
1771 compositions